Londonderry was a county constituency of the Parliament of Northern Ireland from 1921 to 1929. It returned five MPs, using proportional representation by means of the single transferable vote.

Boundaries
Londonderry was created by the Government of Ireland Act 1920 and consisted of the entirety of County Londonderry, including the County Borough of Londonderry. The House of Commons (Method of Voting and Redistribution of Seats) Act (Northern Ireland) 1929 divided the constituency into five constituencies elected under first past the post: City of Londonderry, Foyle, Mid Londonderry, North Londonderry and South Londonderry.

Second Dáil
In May 1921, Dáil Éireann, the parliament of the self-declared Irish Republic run by Sinn Féin, passed a resolution declaring that elections to the House of Commons of Northern Ireland and the House of Commons of Southern Ireland would be used as the election for the Second Dáil. All those elected were on the roll of the Second Dáil, but Eoin MacNeill, who was also elected for the National University of Ireland, was the only MP elected for Londonderry to sit as a TD in Dáil Éireann.

Politics
Londonderry was a predominantly Unionist area with a substantial Nationalist minority, electing three Unionists, one Nationalist and one Sinn Féin member in 1921 and three Unionists and two Nationalists in 1925.

Members of Parliament

Elections results

References

Northern Ireland Parliament constituencies established in 1921
Northern Ireland Parliament constituencies disestablished in 1929
Constituencies of the Northern Ireland Parliament
Historic constituencies in County Londonderry
Dáil constituencies in Northern Ireland (historic)